Rahmatabad (also Romanized as Raḩmatābād) is a village in Zarrin Rural District, Atamalek District, Jowayin County, Razavi Khorasan Province, Iran. At the 2006 census, its population was 524, in 115 families.

References 

Populated places in Joveyn County